Caloptilia yasudai is a moth of the family Gracillariidae. It is known from Japan (the islands of Hokkaidō and Honshū) and Korea.

The wingspan is 12-14.5 mm.

References

yasudai
Moths of Asia
Moths described in 1982